Daniele Bracciali and Potito Starace are the defending champions, but chose not to participate.

Seeds

Draw

References
 Main Draw

AON Open Challenger - Doubles
AON Open Challenger
AON